Emiliano Testini (born January 9, 1977 in Perugia) is an Italian footballer who plays as a midfielder for Italian club Spezia.

Career
Testini made his debut in Serie A 22 December 1996 with the shirt of A.C. Perugia in the match finished with the result Bologna-Perugia 0-0 in what was his only match in the Italian top flight. Perugia also competed in the European 2000 Intertoto Cup.

External links
 https://web.archive.org/web/20110526050625/http://www.triestinacalcio.it/squadra/prima-squadra/giocatori/emiliano-testini
 http://www.acspezia.com/notizie/Mercato-trovato-laccordo-con-Emiliano-Testini.3779.html

1977 births
Living people
Italian footballers
Association football wingers
A.C. Perugia Calcio players